"Life Is a Cabaret" is the fourteenth and final episode of the fifth season of the Canadian television sitcom Schitt's Creek. In the episode, Patrick and Stevie perform in a local rendition of the musical Cabaret.

Reception
Maggie Fremont of Vulture.com rated the episode 5 out of 5 stars.

The episode received seven Canadian Screen Award nominations at the 8th Canadian Screen Awards in 2020, for Best Costume Design (Debra Hanson), Best Photography in a Comedy Series (Gerald Packer), Best Picture Editing in a Comedy Series (Trevor Ambrose), Best Production Design or Art Direction in a Fiction Program or Series (Brendan Smith), Best Sound in a Fiction Program or Series (Rob Hegedus, Kathy Choi, Herwig Gayer, Martin Lee and Jane Tattersall), Best Hairstyling (Annastasia Cucullo and Ana Sorys) and Best Direction in a Comedy Series (Dan Levy and Andrew Cividino). Cucullo and Sorys won the award for Best Hairstyling.

References

External links

2019 Canadian television episodes
Schitt's Creek